Haplocochlias calidimaris is a species of sea snail, a marine gastropod mollusk in the family Skeneidae.

Description
The size of the shell attains 2 mm.

Distribution
This species occurs in the Gulf of Mexico and in the Caribbean Sea.

References

 Pilsbry & McGinty 1945, Nautilus 59: 56–57, li. 6, fig. 4 
 Rubio F., Fernández-Garcés R. & Rolán E. 2013. The genus Haplocochlias (Gastropoda, Skeneidae). Iberus, 31(2): 41-126-page(s): 89–91

External links

calidimaris
Gastropods described in 1945